Annie Swan Coburn (1856–1932) was an American art collector and patron. She collected American art and French Impressionist paintings. Upon her death she left artworks to the Art Institute of Chicago, the Fogg Museum at Harvard University, and Smith College. The Art Institute received more than one hundred works of art.

Life
Swan was born in Fremont, Illinois in 1856. In 1880 she married Lewis Larned Coburn.

Lewis Larned Coburn died in 1910 and at that time Annie Swan Coburn began collecting art. She exhibited her collection in her apartment in the Blackstone Hotel, filling up much of the available space, including storing Vincent van Gogh's Sunny Midi, Arles under her bed. She died in Chicago in 1932.

Legacy
Upon her death she left artworks to the Art Institute of Chicago, the Fogg Museum at Harvard University, and Smith College. The "Coburn Renoirs" became the core of the Art Institute's Impressionist painting collection.

Selections of paintings donated to the Art Institute of Chicago
Paintings donated by Mrs. Lewis Larned (Annie Swan) Coburn in the public domain and for which pictures are available.

References

1856 births
1932 deaths
American art collectors
People from Chicago